Declaration of War is a 2011 French film directed by Valérie Donzelli, and written by and starring Donzelli and Jérémie Elkaïm; it is based on actual events in their lives together, when they were a young couple caring for their dangerously ill son. It was released on the 31 August 2011 and received very positive reviews; Allociné, a review aggregation website gave it an average of 4.3 stars out of five. Le Monde gave it a full five stars, saying "Against cancer, an undoubtable force of happiness". The film was selected as the French entry for the Best Foreign Language Film at the 84th Academy Awards, but it did not make the final shortlist.

Cast

 Valérie Donzelli as Juliette
 Jérémie Elkaïm as Roméo Benaïm
 César Desseix as Adam (18 months old)
 Gabriel Elkaïm as Adam (8 years old)
 Brigitte Sy as Claudia, Roméo's mother
 Elina Löwensohn as Alex, Claudia's wife
 Michèle Moretti as Geneviève, Juliette's mother
 Philippe Laudenbach as Philippe, Juliette's father
 Bastien Bouillon as Nikos
 Béatrice De Staël as Doctor Prat, pediatrician
 Anne Le Ny as Doctor Fitoussi, neurologist
 Frédéric Pierrot as Doctor Sainte-Rose, surgeon
 Blanche Gardin as The Hostess Necker
 Jennifer Decker as A girl at the feast of Jeanne

Awards and nominations

See also
 List of submissions to the 84th Academy Awards for Best Foreign Language Film
 List of French submissions for the Academy Award for Best Foreign Language Film

References

External links

2011 films
2011 comedy-drama films
French comedy-drama films
2010s French-language films
Films set in Paris
Films set in Marseille
Films directed by Valérie Donzelli
2010s French films